The basking shark (Cetorhinus maximus) is the second-largest living shark and fish, after the whale shark, and one of three plankton-eating shark species, along with the whale shark and megamouth shark. Adults typically reach  in length. It is usually greyish-brown, with mottled skin, with the inside of the mouth being white in color. The caudal fin has a strong lateral keel and a crescent shape. Other common names include bone shark, elephant shark, sail-fish, and sun-fish. In Orkney it is called hoe-mother (contracted homer), meaning "the mother of the picked dog-fish".

The basking shark is a cosmopolitan migratory species, found in all the world's temperate oceans. A slow-moving filter feeder, its common name derives from its habit of feeding at the surface, appearing to be basking in the warmer water there. It has anatomical adaptations for filter-feeding, such as a greatly enlarged mouth and highly developed gill rakers. Its snout is conical and the gill slits extend around the top and bottom of its head. The gill rakers, dark and bristle-like, are used to catch plankton as water filters through the mouth and over the gills. The teeth are numerous and very small, and often number 100 per row. The teeth have a single conical cusp, are curved backwards and are the same on both the upper and lower jaws. This species has the smallest weight-for-weight brain size of any shark, reflecting its relatively passive lifestyle.

Basking sharks have been shown from satellite tracking to overwinter in both continental shelf (less than ) and deeper waters. They may be found in either small shoals or alone. Despite their large size and threatening appearance, basking sharks are not aggressive and are harmless to humans.

The basking shark has long been a commercially important fish as a source of food, shark fin, animal feed, and shark liver oil. Overexploitation has reduced its populations to the point where some have disappeared and others need protection.

Taxonomy
The basking shark is the only extant member of the family Cetorhinidae, part of the mackerel shark order Lamniformes. Johan Ernst Gunnerus first described the species as Cetorhinus maximus, from a specimen found in Norway, naming it. The genus name Cetorhinus comes from the Greek ketos, meaning "marine monster" or "whale", and rhinos, meaning "nose". The species name maximus is from Latin and means "greatest". Following its initial description, more attempts at naming included: Squalus isodus, in 1819 by Italian Zoologist Saverio Macri (1754–1848);  Squalus elephas, by Charles Alexandre Lesueur in 1822; Squalus rashleighanus, by Jonathan Couch in 1838; Squalus cetaceus, by Laurens Theodorus Gronovius in 1854; Cetorhinus blainvillei by the Portuguese biologist Felix Antonio de Brito Capello (1828–1879) in 1869; Selachus pennantii, by Charles John Cornish in 1885; Cetorhinus maximus infanuncula, by the Dutch Zoologists Antonius Boudewijn Deinse (1885–1965) and Marcus Jan Adriani (1929–1995) in 1953; and Cetorhinus maximus normani, by Siccardi in 1961.

Evolutionary history 
The oldest known members of Cetorhinidae are members of the extinct genus Keasius, from middle Eocene of Antarctica, the Eocene of Oregon and possibly the Eocene of Russia. Members of the modern genus Cetorhinus appear during the Miocene, with members of the modern species appearing during the Late Miocene. The association of Pseudocetorhinus from the Late Triassic of Europe with Cetorhinidae is doubtful.

Range and habitat
The basking shark is a coastal-pelagic shark found worldwide in boreal to warm-temperate waters. It lives around the continental shelf and occasionally enters brackish waters. It is found from the surface down to at least . It is often seen close to land, including in bays with narrow openings. The shark follows plankton concentrations in the water column, so is often visible at the surface. It characteristically migrates with the seasons.

Anatomy and appearance
The basking shark regularly reaches  in length with some individuals reaching . A  specimen trapped in a herring net in the Bay of Fundy, Canada, in 1851 has been credited as the largest recorded. A study looking at the growth and longevity of the basking shark suggested that individuals larger than ~ are unlikely. This is the second-largest extant fish species, after the whale shark.

They possess the typical shark lamniform body plan and have been mistaken for great white sharks. Great whites possess large, dagger-like teeth; basking shark teeth are much smaller  and hooked; only the first three or four rows of the upper jaw and six or seven rows of the lower jaw function. In behaviour, the great white is an active predator of large animals and not a filter feeder.

Other distinctive characteristics include a strongly keeled caudal peduncle, highly textured skin covered in placoid scales and a mucus layer, a pointed snout—distinctly hooked in younger specimens—and a lunate caudal fin. In large individuals, the dorsal fin may flop to one side when above the surface. Colouration is highly variable (and likely dependent on observation conditions and the individual's condition): commonly, the colouring is dark brown to black or blue dorsally, fading to a dull white ventrally. The sharks are often noticeably scarred, possibly through encounters with lampreys or cookiecutter sharks. The basking shark's liver, which may account for 25% of its body weight, runs the entire length of the abdominal cavity and is thought to play a role in buoyancy regulation and long-term energy storage.

Life history

Basking sharks do not hibernate, and are active year-round.

Surfacing behaviors
They are slow-moving sharks (feeding at about ) and do not evade approaching boats (unlike great white sharks). They are not attracted to chum.

Though the basking shark is large and slow, it can breach, jumping entirely out of the water. This behaviour could be an attempt to dislodge parasites or commensals. Such interpretations are speculative, however, and difficult to verify; breaching in large marine animals such as whales and sharks might equally well be intraspecific threat displays of size and strength.

Migration
Argos system satellite tagging of 20 basking sharks in 2003 confirmed basking sharks move thousands of kilometres during the summer and winter, seeking the richest zooplankton patches, often along ocean fronts. They shed and renew their gill rakers in an ongoing process, rather than over one short period.

A 2009 study tagged 25 sharks off the coast of Cape Cod, Massachusetts, and indicated at least some migrate south in the winter. One individual spent a month near the mouth of the Amazon River. They may undertake this journey to aid reproduction.

The whole shark was donated to the Victoria Museum for research, instead of the fins being sold for use in shark fin soup.

While basking sharks are not infrequently seen in the Mediterranean Sea and records exist in the Dardanelles Strait, it is unclear whether they historically reached into deeper basins of Sea of Marmara, Black Sea and Azov Sea.

Social behaviour

Basking sharks are usually solitary but during summer months in particular they aggregate in dense patches of zooplankton where they engage in social behaviour. They can form sex-segregated shoals, usually in small numbers (three or four), but reportedly up to 100 individuals. Small schools in the Bay of Fundy and the Hebrides have been seen swimming nose to tail in circles; their social behaviour in summer months has been studied and is thought to represent courtship.

Predators
Basking sharks have few predators. White sharks have been reported to scavenge on the remains of these sharks. Killer whales have been observed feeding on basking sharks off California in the US and New Zealand. Lampreys are often seen attached to them, although they are unlikely to be able to cut through the shark's thick skin.

Diet

The basking shark is a ram feeder, filtering zooplankton, very small fish, and invertebrates from the water with its gill rakers by swimming forwards with its mouth open. Basking sharks are not indiscriminate feeders on zooplankton. Samples taken in the presence of feeding individuals recorded zooplankton densities 75% higher compared to adjacent non-feeding areas. Basking sharks feed preferentially in zooplankton patches dominated by small planktonic crustaceans called calanoid copepods (on average 1,700 individuals per cubic metre of water). They will also feed on copepods of the genera Psuedocalanus and Oithona. Basking sharks sometimes congregate in groups of up to 1,400 spotted along the northeastern U.S. Samples taken near feeding sharks contained 2.5 times as many Calanus helgolandicus individuals per cubic metre, which were also found to be 50% longer. Unlike the megamouth shark and whale shark, the basking shark relies only on the water it pushes through its gills by swimming; the megamouth shark and whale shark can suck or pump water through their gills.

Reproduction
Basking sharks are ovoviviparous: the developing embryos first rely on a yolk sac, with no placental connection. Their seemingly useless teeth may play a role before birth in helping them feed on the mother's unfertilized ova (a behaviour known as oophagy). In females, only the right ovary appears to function, and it is currently unknown why only one of the organs seems to function.

Only one pregnant female is known to have been caught; she was carrying six unborn young.
Mating is thought to occur in early summer and birthing in late summer, following the female's movement into shallow waters.

Breeding frequency is thought to be two to four years.

The exact lifespan of the basking shark is unknown, but experts estimate to be about 50 years.

Conservation
Aside from direct catches, by-catches in trawl nets have been one of several threats to basking sharks. In New Zealand, basking sharks had been abundant historically; however, after the mass by-catches recorded in 1990s and 2000s, confirmations of the species became very scarce. Management plans have been declared to promote effective conservation. In June 2018 the Department of Conservation classified the basking shark as "Threatened - Nationally Vulnerable" under the New Zealand Threat Classification System.

The eastern north Pacific Ocean population is a U.S. National Marine Fisheries Service species of concern, one of those species about which the U.S. Government's National Oceanic and Atmospheric Administration has some concerns regarding status and threats, but for which insufficient information is available to indicate a need to list the species under the U.S. Endangered Species Act (ESA).

The IUCN Red List indicates this as an endangered species.

The endangered aspect of this shark was publicised in 2005 with a postage stamp issued by Guernsey Post.

Importance to humans

Historically, the basking shark has been a staple of fisheries because of its slow swimming speed, placid nature, and previously abundant numbers. Commercially, it was put to many uses: the flesh for food and fishmeal, the hide for leather, and its large liver (which has a high squalene content) for oil. It is currently fished mainly for its fins (for shark fin soup). Parts (such as cartilage) are also used in traditional Chinese medicine and as an aphrodisiac in Japan, further adding to demand.

As a result of rapidly declining numbers, the basking shark has been protected in some territorial waters and trade in its products is restricted in many countries under CITES. Among others, it is fully protected in the United Kingdom and the Atlantic and Mexican Gulf regions of the United States. Since 2008, it has been illegal to fish for, or retain if accidentally caught, basking sharks in waters of the European Union. It is partially protected in Norway and New Zealand, as targeted commercial fishing is illegal, but accidental bycatch can be used (in Norway any basking shark caught as bycatch and still alive must be released). As of March 2010, it was also listed under Annex I of the CMS Migratory Sharks Memorandum of Understanding.

Once considered a nuisance along the Canadian Pacific coast, basking sharks were the target of a government eradication programme from 1945 to 1970. , efforts were under way to determine whether any sharks still lived in the area and monitor their potential recovery.

It is tolerant of boats and divers approaching it, and may even circle divers, making it an important draw for dive tourism in areas where it is common.

Carcass misidentification
On several occasions, "globster" corpses initially identified by non-scientists as a sea serpents or plesiosaurs have later been identified as likely to be the decomposing carcasses of basking sharks, as in the Stronsay Beast and the Zuiyo-maru cases.

See also

 List of prehistoric cartilaginous fish
 List of threatened sharks
 Shark liver oil

References

General references

 
 
 David A Ebert, Sharks, Rays and Chimaeras of California, 
 
 Marine Conservation Society  Basking shark page
 FAO Figis Species Fact Sheet for basking shark

External links

 
 Irish Basking Shark Project
 BBC Wildlife Finder – video news and news from the BBC archive
 ARKive entry on the Basking Shark
 Fisheries & Oceans Canada – Basking sharks on the west coast of Canada
Basking Sharks in the Isle of Man
 
Basking sharks featured on RNZ Critter of the Week, 24 Jan 2020
Basking Shark - Video on Check123 - Video Encyclopedia

 
Ovoviviparous fish
Cosmopolitan fish
Basking shark
Taxa named by Johan Ernst Gunnerus

Extant Rupelian first appearances
Taxobox binomials not recognized by IUCN